Secret Story 9 is the ninth season of the French reality television series Secret Story, which is based loosely on the international Big Brother format. On April 10, 2015, TF1 and NT1 formalized a ninth season. It was confirmed daily recaps air on NT1 and live shows on TF1.

Following the departure of  Benjamin Castaldi, Christophe Beaugrand and season 8 winner Leila Ben Khalifa will be the presenters. Adrien Lemaitre returns to host the spin-off show: After Secret.

It started on Friday 21 August 2015.

Émilie Fiorelli won the series on Day 85. Due to the November 2015 Paris attacks, the final was cancelled. Émilie confirmed that she had won the series on November 15, 2015 via Instagram, while the final results were announced on November 18.

House of Secrets 
For the second time, after Secret Story 8, the house is located on the rooftop of the studios of AB Productions, where many popular sitcoms were filmed in the 1990s, such as Hélène et les Garçons and Premiers baisers. Perched on a building, the House of Secrets offers to the contestants a wide view of Paris.

Housemates

Ali 
 Ali Suna is a 24-year-old model, from Limoges, France. He entered on Day 1. He was evicted on Day 64.

Alia 
 Alia Chergui is 25, from Paris, France. She works as a receptionist. She entered on Day 1. She was evicted on Day 43.

Arthur « Marley » 
 Arthur Bauzac He entered on Day 1. He was evicted on Day 36.

Claudia 
 Claudia Romani is a 33-year-old model from Miami (originally from Italy). She is Kévin's girlfriend, she shares a secret with Mélanie and Kévin : "We are La Voix's adventurers". She entered the house on Day 1, she will be the Kévin's and Mélanie's guide. She walked on Day 31.

Coralie 
 Coralie Porrovecchio is a 19-year-old model and student, from Belgium. She was finalist in the contest of Miss Belgium 2014. She walked on Day 77.

Émilie 
 Émilie Fiorelli is Loic's twin. She is 25 years old, from Marseille, France. She works as an ambulance attendant. She shares with Loïc the secret : "We are twins". She entered on Day 1. She won the series on Day 85.

Jonathan 
 Jonathan Zidane is 26, from Marseille, France. He entered on Day 1. He is the cousin of a famous French footballer Zinedine Zidane. He became the runner up on Day 85.

Karisma 
 Karisma Flageul  is a 21-year-old student, from Loudéac, Bretagne, France. She entered on Day 1. She was evicted on Day 71.

Kévin 
 Kévin Gleizes is 30. He is Claudia's boyfriend. He is from Miami, United States. He traveled to Dubai with Mélanie because of their secret. He was evicted on Day 29.

Loïc 
 Loic Fiorelli is Émilie's twin. He is 25 years old, from Marseille, France. He works as an ambulance attendant and during winter as a ski instructor. He shares with Émilie the secret : "We are twins".  He entered on Day 1. He finished in fourth place on Day 85.

Manon 
 Manon Schobben is a 21-year-old cashier. She is from Grâce-Hollogne, Belgium, and gave birth to Lola when she was 16. She was evicted on Day 22, The day of his 22 years.

Mélanie 
 Mélanie Da Cruz is 24. She is from Saint-Cloud, France. She was evicted on Day 78.

Nicolas 
 Nicolas Scandale is 32. He is from France. He was evicted on Day 57.

Rémi 
 Rémi Notta is a 24-year-old sporting coach from Saint-Tropez, France. He finished in third place on Day 85.

Tony 
 Tony Scoffield is 26. He is from Melun, France. He was evicted on Day 15.

Vanessa « Lisa » 
 Vanessa Grymonprez is 28, from Paris, France. She participated to Secret Story 3 in 2009, and her secret is : "I am an ex-contestant of Secret Story" She was evicted on Day 8.

Houseguests

Julie 
 Julie Ricci is a contestant of Secret Story 4. She stayed in the house two weeks (Day 57-Day 71) and had a relationship with Loic.

Nathalie 
 Nathalie Andreani is a contestant of Secret Story 8. She stayed in the house two weeks (Day 57-Day 67) and had a relationship with Ali.

Eddy 
 Eddy Ben Youssef is a contestant of Secret Story 7. He stayed in the house two weeks (Day 57-Day 67).

Secrets

Nominations

Notes 
:  In round one of nominations, Ali, Arthur, Émilie, Karisma, Loïc and Manon robbed the immunity inside the house and are immune, with Rémi, as their accomplice.
:  In round one of nominations, Alia, Claudia, Coralie, Jonathan, Nicolas, Tony and Vanessa were nominated because they failed to protect their immunity.
:  Kévin and Mélanie were in Dubai and were immune for not entering the game yet.
:  On Day 11, La Voix punished Karisma for lying about her secret. Her housemates then had to decide whether to save or evict her.
:  In round two of nominations, only female housemates could nominate and only male housemates could be nominated.
:  In week 2, La Voix's adventurers decided to use the power of immunity for Kévin.
:  In round three of nominations, only male housemates could nominate and only female housemates could be nominated.
:  Coralie has agreed to show all the gossip she said about Alia, Mélanie and Émilie to win immunity.
:  In week 3, La Voix's adventurers decided to use the power of ban voting for Rémi.
:  Émilie passed a secret mission that gave to Rémi an immunity for nominations of Week 4.
:  In round four of nominations, only male housemates could be nominated
:  Alia and Coralie had power to nominate the two male housemates of their choice.
:  Nicolas found Mélanie as her accomplice, they both escape nominations.
:  All housemates but Nicolas and Mélanie were up for eviction.
:  Nicolas accepted to reveal 7 clues about his secret to give an immunity to Coralie for the female nominations.
:  Rémi decided to be nominated to give a false clue about Émilie's and Loïc's secret to everyone. Later, Émilie decided to give a clue about her secret to remove Rémi's nomination.
: In week 7, only female housemates could nominate and only male housemates could be nominated.
: Due to Coralie's powers, nominations were canceled.
: Coralie had to pre-nominate two housemates and to evict one of them. She decided to evict Émilie, but the eviction was fake without nobody knowing.
: Émilie won the power of switching to save Loïc in case of nomination by the housemate of her choice. This power works only if Loïc is nominated.
: In week 8, the nominations were as a group decision. Coralie, Nicolas and Jonathan in the Joconi group and Ali, Mélanie, Loïc, Rémi and kKarisma in the Serial Buzzers group. Only male housemates could be nominated.
: Coralie was rewarded with an immunity for volunteering to be nominated.
: Julie (Secret Story 4), Eddy (Secret Story 7) and Nathalie (Secret Story 8) decided to give immunities to Émilie, Jonathan and Mélanie.
: Coralie could choose to protect an important clue about her secret by removing her immunity and giving it to Rémi or let the clue come out and remain immune. She accepted to protect a clue about her secret and she is no longer immune but Rémi is.
: Participants had to vote for the housemate that should win a place in the pre-finals. Émilie received the most votes and is immune during week 10.
:After several tests, Coralie won his place in the final against Jonathan. Jonathan has directly been nominated, and Coralie has drawn each person who would be nominated by his side: Emilie. Emilie and Jonathan were therefore automatically nominated and one of them had to leave the house on Thursday evening. However, Coralie looked back because his friend Jonathan has been nominated by her fault, and asked the voice to cancel his place in the final, which also cancels this nominations.

Nominations : results

References

External links
  Official website for Secret Story
  Social network page for Secret Story
 Big brother news site

2015 French television seasons
09